USS Morgan County (LST-1048) was an  built for the United States Navy in World War II. Like most ships of her class, she was originally known only by her designation, USS LST-1048, and, like all remaining LSTs, was named on 1 July 1955, after eleven counties in the U.S.

LST‑1048 was laid down on 7 January 1945 by the Dravo Corporation of Neville Island, Pennsylvania. Launched on 17 February 1945, sponsored by Mrs. L. P. Struble; she was placed in partial commission on 15 March 1945 for the cruise down the Mississippi River; and commissioned at New Orleans on 28 March 1945.

Service history

World War II, 1945–1946
After shakedown off Florida, LST‑1048 departed New Orleans on 1 May 1945 for Hawaii, arriving at Pearl Harbor on 3 June. She sailed to the Marshall Islands, where she transported ammunition between various bases for the next three months, before departing Saipan on 14 September with units of the 3rd Marine Division destined for duty in Japan.

LST‑1048 was decommissioned in Japan on 14 May 1946, and was turned over to the Army for the next five years to aid in the task of repatriation.

Korean War, 1950–1956
Following the outbreak of hostilities in Korea, she returned to U.S. Navy service and was recommissioned at Yokosuka, Japan, on 26 August 1950, reaching Korea in time to play an important role in the Inchon invasion. She continued to operate in Korean waters into early 1951, before returning home, arriving at San Diego on 21 April. Her next western Pacific tour included a survey of the Marshalls for CINCPACFLT. She then returned to Japan, arriving Yokosuka on 26 April 1952, to resume cargo and transport operations in the war zone, in support of UN forces in Korea. In December she returned to the west coast.

During a 1953 run to supply stations in the Arctic region, she was beset in ice near Barter Island Alaska in the Beaufort Sea; and was freed by USCGC Northwind. On 19 October 1953 she sailed from San Diego, California for the Far East, where she participated in amphibious exercises, returning to the United States in May 1954. Following overhaul at Mare Island, she reported to her new base at Long Beach, California in June 1955. LST‑1048 was named USS Morgan County (LST-1048) on 1 July.

Decommissioning and sale
Morgan County was decommissioned on 10 May 1956, and was turned over to the Military Sea Transportation Service. She was struck from the Navy List on 1 August 1959, and sold on 10 June 1960 to Ships, Inc.

Awards
LST‑1048 received three battle stars for Korean service.

References

External links
 

 

LST-542-class tank landing ships
World War II amphibious warfare vessels of the United States
Cold War amphibious warfare vessels of the United States
Korean War amphibious warfare vessels of the United States
Ships built in Pittsburgh
USS Morgan County (LST-1048)
USS Morgan County (LST-1048)
USS Morgan County (LST-1048)
USS Morgan County (LST-1048)
USS Morgan County (LST-1048)
USS Morgan County (LST-1048)
USS Morgan County (LST-1048)
USS Morgan County (LST-1048)
USS Morgan County (LST-1048)
USS Morgan County (LST-1048)
USS Morgan County (LST-1048)
1945 ships
Ships built by Dravo Corporation